The Mule Mountains of California are located in the southeastern part of the state in the United States. The range lies in a northeast-southwesterly direction south of the McCoy Mountains and west of the Palo Verde Valley and Colorado River. The northern end of the range is in Riverside County, and the southern end is in Imperial County.

References

 

Blythe, California
Mountain ranges of Riverside County, California
Mountain ranges of Southern California
Mountain ranges of the Colorado Desert
Mountain ranges of the Lower Colorado River Valley